Sweden chose their song and singer for the Eurovision Song Contest 1989 in the national preselection Melodifestivalen 1989. With a small margin, the winner was Tommy Nilsson with the power ballad "En dag", written by Tim Norell, Ola Håkansson and Alexander Bard.

Before Eurovision

Melodifestivalen 1989
Melodifestivalen 1989 was the selection for the 29th song to represent Sweden at the Eurovision Song Contest. It was the 28th time that this system of picking a song had been used. 1,223 songs were submitted to SVT for the competition. The hostess, Yvonne Ryding, was the 1984 Miss Universe. The final was held in the Globe Arena in Stockholm on 11 March 1989, was broadcast on SVT1 and was not broadcast on radio. The show was watched by 5,328,000 people.

Voting

At Eurovision 
The song was drawn #10 at the contest in Lausanne, Switzerland. It scored very well, receiving a total of 110 points, making Sweden finish 4th, only 1 point behind their 3rd-placed neighbour Denmark.

Voting

References

External links
TV broadcastings at SVT's open archive

1989
Countries in the Eurovision Song Contest 1989
1989
Eurovision
Eurovision